Little Falls Township may refer to the following townships in the United States:

 Little Falls Township, Morrison County, Minnesota
 Little Falls Township, New Jersey in Passaic County